Stephen Harrison may refer to:

Stephen Harrison (classicist) (born 1960), British classicist
Stephen Harrison (swimmer) (born 1957), English swimmer
Stephen A. Harrison, American political candidate in New York
Stephen C. Harrison, American academic
Stephen D. Harrison, founding president of the New York Cotton Exchange in 1870

See also
Harrison (name)
Steve Harrison (disambiguation)